Goodenia viscidula is a species of flowering plant in the family Goodeniaceae and is endemic to northern Australia. It is an erect annual herb with sticky, hairy foliage, egg-shaped to lance-shaped leaves with the narrower end towards the base, and thyrses or panicles of purplish-blue flowers.

Description
Flowering occurs from March to May.

Taxonomy and naming
Goodenia viscidula was first formally described in 1980 by Roger Charles Carolin in the journal Telopea from a specimen he collected near Borroloola in 1974. The specific epithet (viscidula) means "somewhat sticky".

Distribution
This goodenia grows in seasonally damp place in northern parts of the Northern Territory and near the Gulf of Carpentaria in Queensland.

Conservation status
Goodenia viscidula is classified as of "least concern" under the Northern Territory Government Territory Parks and Wildlife Conservation Act 1976 and the Queensland Government Nature Conservation Act 1992.

References

viscidula
Flora of Queensland
Flora of the Northern Territory
Plants described in 1990
Taxa named by Roger Charles Carolin